KTSR (92.1 FM, "Magic 92.1") is an urban AC formatted broadcast radio station licensed to DeQuincy, Louisiana, serving Southwest Louisiana.  KTSR is owned and operated by Townsquare Media.  The station's studios are located on North Lakeshore Drive, just northwest of downtown Lake Charles, and its transmitter is located in Sulphur, Louisiana.

History
The station first signed-on on November 1, 1985. From 2004 to 2017, it aired a Top 40 format, both as "Star 92.1" from 2004 to 2009 and as "92.1 Kiss FM" from 2009 to 2017. In 2017, the station shifted to classic rock as “Classic Rock 92.1”.

On May 22, 2020, at 4:00 PM, Townsquare Media changed the classic rock format to Hot AC as the new “92.1 The Bridge”.

On October 5, 2020, KTSR changed their format from hot adult contemporary to urban adult contemporary, branded as "Magic 92.1" (format moved from KLCL 1470 AM Lake Charles, which went silent).

Former logos

References

External links
Magic 92.1 Online

1985 establishments in Louisiana
Urban adult contemporary radio stations in the United States
Radio stations established in 1985
TSR
Townsquare Media radio stations